Jacob F. Drauby  (1864–1916) was a Major League Baseball third baseman who played in ten games for the Washington Senators of the National League in 1892. He also had an extensive minor league career that lasted from 1886 through 1902.
Drauby changed his surname to his original surname of Taubert sometime after he finished his Major League career.

References

External links

1864 births
1916 deaths
Major League Baseball third basemen
Washington Senators (1891–1899) players
19th-century baseball players
Baseball players from Harrisburg, Pennsylvania
Charleston Quakers players
Danbury Hatters players
Hazleton Pugilists players
Dallas Hams players
Cedar Rapids Canaries players
Harrisburg Ponies players
Scranton Indians players
Johnstown Pirates players
Buffalo Bisons (minor league) players
Providence Grays (minor league) players
Providence Clamdiggers (baseball) players
Reading Coal Heavers players
Richmond Blue Birds players
Newport News Shipbuilders players
Richmond Bluebirds players
Shreveport Giants players
Newark Sailors players